Lorymodes australis is a species of snout moth in the genus Lorymodes. It was described by Pierre Viette in 1960, and is known from Madagascar.

References

Moths described in 1960
Pyralinae